Orthodontic separators (also known as spacers) are rubber bands or metal appliances used in orthodontics. Spacers are placed between the molars at the second orthodontic appointment before molar bands are applied. They are usually added a week before you get your braces, but can sometimes be added after. 

Spacers are either circular rubber bands about a centimeter in diameter placed between top and bottom molars; there may be 1-12 spacers applied or small metal spring clips (spring separators) that push the molars apart. The spacers stay between the teeth for one week and move the teeth apart slowly until they are far apart enough so that orthodontists can fit a tooth brace or molar band in between them or fit an expander with rubber rings or other appliances.

Purpose 
Spacers are usually used to put spaces in between teeth before braces are established. It can be agitating or painful, but patients are often warned not to pick at them or they will fall out. They are usually rubber, but sometimes they can be metal. They can be used when a patient's teeth are too close together. 

Although they are sometimes very painful, they are usually only in place for one to two weeks. Spacers can also cause toothache and gum pain because of the constant pressure against the patient's teeth. The gaps that the spacers create are necessary to apply certain appliances or braces. 

There are two common types of expanders used after the spaces have been made. One very primitive, model is a metal bar that has a key used to tighten. Secondly, and more contemporary, there is an expander that is two "L" shaped metal rods, attached at the molars. Brackets fit against the edges. It is secured with a spring in the middle that applies pressure.

Pain 
There are various reactions patients experience to having spacers placed between their teeth. If the patient has a relatively small amount of space between their molars (or none at all), then the spacer may irritate the nerves in the gum of the mouth, causing constant pain. In some cases the spacer digs into the gums, causing bleeding and swelling; and would be more uncomfortable than the actual braces. An orthodontist may advise the patient to drink cold drinks or to eat ice cream, producing a similar, although less efficient and short-lasting effect. 

Spacers are usually painful, although pain relievers can alleviate the pain if needed. Depending on the placement of the patient's teeth, spacers may not hurt when first applied, then start to hurt after some time, or they may immediately start to hurt. Depending on the type, spacers may cause pain while chewing, making certain foods (usually those that are tough or crispy) difficult to eat. Some people may also experience a sensation similar to losing their baby teeth or like having food stuck between their teeth. The patient may feel the need to try to remove the spacer but that isn't advised as it makes the next step in the treatment process harder and more painful. Brushing will not cause spacers to be displaced and regular, if not more, brushing while spacers are in place is encouraged.

Application 
The application process of spacers usually involves stringing floss through the rubber band and placing the spacer between the teeth. Some spacers are small metal spring clips that squeeze the teeth apart. There is some pressure throughout the process and some soreness after, but overall, the spacer application process is quite painless, although the patient may immediately start to feel pain from the pressure exerted on the teeth. Sometimes special orthodontic tools are used to stretch open the rubber bands, depending on how crowded the teeth are. If the jaw is especially crowded, the spacers may cause intense constant pain due to the teeth moving closer together. This pain begins a while after placement and usually lasts for several days.

Removal 

Spacers are worn until the orthodontist removes them or they are removed accidentally. Spacers may also fall out on their own without being removed by the patient by picking or eating sticky foods. Sometimes, a dentist may use a spacer that is similar to a metal spacer (see below), but is removable and in some cases, it may have a key or string used to adjust the tightness. The spacers are usually taken out one minute before braces are fitted, however, in some instances, it can be up to a week before.

Metal spacers 
Metal spacers are small and metal and are placed around the tooth. These are most commonly used while braces are already on another set of teeth. These are often worn longer than rubber bands and tend to be more painful. These are not used as often as the rubber bands. They also may tear into the gums.

References 

 Orthodontic appliances